Lazarevo is an urban neighborhood in the city of Banjaluka, Bosnia and Herzegovina (Republika Srpska entity). Populated place Lazarevo is located in the northern part of the city Banjaluka. Lazarevo is one of the largest and most organized neighborhoods in the city.
Lazarevo consists of two local communities:

 Lazarevo 1
 Lazarevo 2

History

In the first half of the 19th ages, then Budžak (now Lazarеvo) was a village near Banja Luka, which was sparsely populated. The villagers have built houses away from the main road (road Gradiška), because it was safer to live in during the Ottoman rule. During the Austro-Hungarians, the growing resort (old Gradiska road). Then he built a train station. Until in 1969. there was a hydroelectric power plant in Trappist.

Population

Before the war, Lazarevo was divided in four local communities. According to the census in 1991., This town had 15,786 inhabitants. Of that 8,642, or 54.7% Serbs 1068, or 6.7% Muslims, 2913 or 18.4% Croats, 2309 or 14.62 Yugoslavs and 854 or 5.4% of the others.

Religious buildings

There are two religious building. The monastery of Trappist monks, it is the only Trappist monastery in Southeastern Europe. At the beginning of the 20th century, with 219 monks, the Abbey was the largest Trappist abbey in the world. 
There is also an Eastern Orthodox church Lazarica.

Gallery

References

External links

Banja Luka City homepage

Roman Catholic Diocese of Banja Luka
Populated places in Banja Luka

Geography of Banja Luka